Norosbaldo Morales (January 4, 1911 – January 15, 1964) was a Puerto Rican pianist and bandleader.

Biography
Morales was born in the subbarrio Puerta de Tierra of San Juan, Puerto Rico, and learned several instruments as a child. He played in Venezuela from 1924 to 1930, then returned to Puerto Rico to play with Rafael Muñoz. He emigrated to New York City in 1935, and played there with Alberto Socarras and Augusto Cohen. In 1939, he and brothers Humberto and Esy put together the Brothers Morales Orchestra. He released the tune "Serenata Ritmica" on Decca Records in 1942, which catapulted him to fame in the Latin music scene, then dominated by rhumba and later by mambo. His band rivaled Machito's in popularity in New York in the 1940s.

It was during this time that his orchestra played for the Havana Madrid nightclub. His lush 1952 Mambo with Noro 10" album is a landmark in conjunto latin music, a classic mambo album that was part of the 1950s mambo craze, showing the influence of Puerto Rico in the new style.

In 1960 Morales returned to Puerto Rico and played locally; he also worked with Tito Rodríguez, José Luis Moneró, Chano Pozo, Willie Rosario and Tito Puente. Among the musicians who played in Morales' orchestra were Ray Santos, Jorge López, Rafí Carrero, Juancito Torres, Pin Madera, Ralph Kemp, Pepito Morales, Carlos Medina, Lidio Fuentes, Simón Madera, Ana Carrero, Pellin Rodriguez, and Avilés.

The height of his fame and record production was his production of rumba records with his sextet, done after he gave up the big band idea. His use of the piano as both melody and rhythm was highly innovative at the time. ["Linda Mujer"], ["Campanitas de Cristal"], ["Perfume de Gardenias"], ["Me Pica La Lengua"] and ["Silencio"], all songs composed by others, were four of his big successes in this line.

Death
Like his brothers, Morales suffered from diabetes and, by the early 1960s, he was severely obese and nearly blind. He died of uremia on January 15, 1964, at Hospital San Jorge, in San Juan, aged 53. He was buried in Puerto Rico Memorial (also known as Cementerio Fournier) in Carolina, Puerto Rico.

References

External links
Noro Morales at Flickr Commons
Noro Morales. Music of Puerto Rico.

1911 births
1964 deaths
People from San Juan, Puerto Rico
20th-century Puerto Rican musicians
RCA Victor artists